Jacob ben Meir (1100 – 9 June 1171 (4 Tammuz)), best known as Rabbeinu Tam, was one of the most renowned Ashkenazi Jewish rabbis and leading French Tosafists, a leading halakhic authority in his generation, and a grandson of Rashi. Known as "Rabbeinu" (our teacher), he acquired the Hebrew suffix "Tam" meaning straightforward; it was originally used in the Book of Genesis to describe his biblical namesake, Jacob.

Biography 

Jacob ben Meir was born in the French country village of Ramerupt, today in the Aube département of northern-central France, to Meir ben Shmuel and Yocheved, daughter of Rashi. His primary teachers were his father and his brother, Shmuel ben Meir, known as Rashbam. His other brothers were Isaac, known as the Rivam, and Solomon the Grammarian. He married Miriam, the sister of Rabbi Shimshon ben Yosef of Falaise, Calvados, who may have been his second wife.

His reputation as a legal scholar spread far beyond France. Avraham ibn Daud, the Spanish chronicler of the sages, mentioned Rabbeinu Tam in his Sefer HaKabbalah, but not Rashi. The Italian Mishnaic exegete, Rabbi Isaac ben Melchizedek of Siponto, maintained a written correspondence with Rabbeinu Tam. Rabbeinu Tam's work is also cited by Rabbi Zerachya HaLevi, a Provençal critic. He maintained a scholarly correspondence with Aaron ben Joseph of Beaugency and received questions from students throughout France and from the Italian communities of Bari and Otranto.

Rabbeinu Tam gave his Beth Din the title of "the generation's [most] significant court", and indeed, he is known for communal enactments improving Jewish family life, education, and women's status. At times, he criticised Halakhic opponents, notably in his controversies with Meshullam of Melun and Efraim of Regensburg.

In or around 1160, a synod was held in Troyes as part of the Takkanot Shum. This synod was led by Rabbeinu Tam, his brother, the Rashbam, and Eliezer ben Nathan (the Ra'avan). Over 250 rabbis from communities all over France attended as well. A number of communal decrees were enacted at the synod covering both Jewish-Gentile relations as well as matters relating internally to the Jewish community.

Halakhic disputes

Phylacteries
Legend has it that when Rashi was holding his infant grandson, the baby touched the phylacteries (tefillin) that were on Rashi's head. Rashi predicted that this grandson would later disagree with him about the order of the scripts that are put in the head tefillin. Regardless of the episode's veracity, Rabbeinu Tam did disagree with the opinion of his antecedent. Today, both "Rashi tefillin" and "Rabbeinu Tam tefillin" are produced: the Shulchan Aruch requires wearing Rashi's version and recommends that God-fearing Jews wear both in order to satisfy both halakhic opinions. However: 

However, many Sephardic and chasidic Jews wear Rabbeinu Tam's Tefillin (in addition to wearing Rashi's) per opinions presented in the Shulchan Aruch and its extensive commentaries authored throughout the early-modern and modern era. The rise and articulation of chasidic philosophy has conflated the kabbalistic and halakhic aspects of Rabbeinu Tam's position, popularizing the custom to wear both pairs every day. Wearing Rabbeinu Tam tefillin is an almost universal custom among the many and diverse communities that follow the teachings of the Baal Shem Tov and his students.

Mezuzah
Another halakhic disagreement between Rabbeinu Tam and Rashi concerns the placement of the mezuzah. Rashi rules that it should be mounted on the doorpost in a vertical position; Rabbeinu Tam holds that it should be mounted horizontally. In a compromise solution, many Ashkenazi Jews place the mezuzah on the door in a slanted position. Sephardi Jews mount the mezuzah vertically, per the opinions of Rashi, Maimonides, and the Shulchan Aruch.

Liturgical poet 

In the field of Hebrew poetry the importance of R. Tam is not slight. He was influenced by the poetry of the Spaniards, and is the chief representative of the transition period, in Christian lands, from the old "payyeṭanic" mode of expression to the more graceful forms of the Spanish school. According to Zunz, he composed the following pieces for the synagogue: (1) several poems for the evening prayer of Sukkot and of Shemini Atzeret; (2) a hymn for the close of Sabbath on which a wedding is celebrated; (3) a hymn for the replacing of the Torah rolls in the Ark on Simchat Torah; (4) an "ofan" in four metric strophes; (5) four Aramaic reshut; (6) two selichot (the second is reproduced by Zunz in S.P. p. 248, in German verse). It must, however, be remarked that there was a synagogal poet by the name of Jacob ben Meïr (Levi) who might easily have been confounded with the subject of this article, and therefore Tam's authorship of all of these poems is not above doubt.

The short poems which sometimes precede his responsa also show great poetic talent and a pure Hebrew style (see Bacher in Monatsschrift, xliv.56 et seq.). When Abraham ibn Ezra was traveling through France R. Tam greeted him in verse, whereupon Ibn Ezra exclaimed in astonishment: "Who has admitted the French into the temple of poetry?" (Kerem Ḥemed, vii.35). Another work of his in metric form is his poem on the accents, which contains forty-five strophes riming in; it is found in various libraries (Padua, Hamburg, Parma), and is entitled Maḥberet. Luzzatto has given the first four strophes in Kerem Ḥemed (vii.38), and Halberstam has printed the whole poem in Kobak's "Jeschurun" (v.123).

Gravesite 

Rabbeinu Tam and his brothers, the Rashbam and the Rivam, as well as other Tosafists, were buried in Ramerupt. The unmarked, ancient cemetery in which they are buried lies adjacent to a street called Street of the Great Cemetery. In 2005, Rabbi Yisroel Meir Gabbai, a Breslover Hasid who renovates and repairs neglected gravesites of Jewish leaders around the world, helped to determine the exact boundaries of the cemetery. In addition, a member of the Jewish religious community in Paris bought a house at the site and converted it into a beth midrash.

Works 

Rabbeinu Tam's best known work is Sefer HaYashar, which contained both novellae and responsa, its main purpose to resolve Talmudic textual problems without resorting to emendations of the received text. Even the best editions show considerable corruption of the original work, and all present editions of Sefer HaYashar are fragments collected from it. Responsa of Rabbeinu Jacob of Ramerupt (Hebrew) was published by Rabbi Yosef Kafih in 1968. Tam also authored a much-cited work of Biblical philology, Rulings of Rabbeinu Tam, in which he weighed in on the debates of Menahem b. Saruq and Dunash b. Labrat.

Notes

References 
Attribution

External links 

 
 

1100 births
1171 deaths
12th-century French rabbis
French Ashkenazi Jews
French Tosafists
Authors of books on Jewish law
People from Aube